Bidhan Chandra College may refer to:

 Bidhan Chandra College, Asansol
 Bidhan Chandra College, Rishra